Toshitami Kaihara (August 24, 1933 - November 13, 2014) became a Vice Governor in 1970 and Governor of Hyogo Profecture in 1986, a position he held for four terms over 15 years. Prior to that he was an official at the Ministry of Home Affairs. He held a place in the government for over two decades. He took an active role in the Hyogo earthquake aftermath, presiding over the Hyogo Earthquake Memorial 21st Century Research Institute. He was also Director General of the Environment Award.

References

1933 births
2014 deaths
Governors of Hyōgo Prefecture
Commandeurs of the Ordre des Arts et des Lettres